The Copa del Generalísimo 1942 Final was the 40th final of the King's Cup. The final was played at Estadio Chamartín in madrid, on 21 June 1942, being won by CF Barcelona, who beat Club Atlético de Bilbao 4-3 after extra time.

Details

See also
Athletic–Barcelona clásico

References

1942
Copa
FC Barcelona matches
Athletic Bilbao matches